Medium Rare may refer to:
 Medium rare, a degree of doneness used with cooking meat
 Medium Rare (film), a 1992 film from Singapore
 Medium Rare (production company), event production company
 Medium Rare (radio show) (1987–1993), a radio program on CHEZ-FM from Ottawa, Canada
 Medium Rare (Foo Fighters album), 2011
 Medium Rare (The Mighty Mighty Bosstones album), 2007

See also
Medium, Rare & Remastered, a 2009 compilation album by U2
Medium Rarities (disambiguation)